Alfredo Le Pera (4 June 1900 – 24 June 1935) was an Argentine journalist, dramatist, and lyricist, best known for his brief but fruitful collaboration with the renowned tango singer Carlos Gardel.  He died in a plane accident with Gardel when he was at the height of his career.

Biography
Le Pera was born in São Paulo, Brazil, the son of Italian immigrants who moved to Buenos Aires, Argentina in 1902. At the beginning of his career, he worked for several Argentinian periodicals as a journalist and theatre critic and in 1928 became involved in the film industry. He worked for Paramount Pictures while living in Paris and in 1932 the studio arranged for him to work with Carlos Gardel, at a time when the company was looking for ways to increase Gardel's international appeal. Le Pera wrote the scripts for a series of films, including Melodía de Arrabal (1933), Cuesta abajo (1934), El Tango en Broadway (1934), El día que me quieras (1935) and Tango Bar (1935), and also wrote the lyrics for tangos composed and performed by Gardel in these films. These tangos would become classics of the genre across the Spanish-speaking world.

Gardel and Le Pera were coming to the end of a promotional tour for the film El dia que me quieras when, on Monday, 24 June 1935, the plane in which they were taking off from the airport in Medellin, Colombia crashed into another plane on the runway, killing them both and most of the other passengers on board, including the other musicians travelling with them.

Le Pera is credited with elevating the literary quality of tango lyrics while respecting the popular character of the musical form.

Lyrics

Le Pera wrote the lyrics and Gardel the music for the following compositions:

Amargura (tango)
Amores de Estudiante (waltz)
Apure, delantero buey (song)
Arrabal amargo (tango)
Caminito soleado (song)
Cheating muchachita
Criollita, deci que si (song)
Cuesta abajo (tango)
El día que me quieras (song)
Golondrinas (tango)
Guitarra, guitarra mia 
La criolla
La vida en un trago
Lejana tierra mia (song)
Melodia de arrabal (tango)
Mi Buenos Aires querido (tango)
Olvido
Por tu boca roja
Por una cabeza (tango)
Quiereme
Recuerdo malevo (tango)
Rubias de New York (foxtrot)
Soledad (tango)
Suerte negra (waltz)
Sus ojos se cerraron (tango)
Viejos tiempos (tango)
Volver (tango)
Volvio una noche (tango)

Selected filmography
 Suburban Melody (1933)
The Tango on Broadway (1934)
 Downward Slope (1934)

References

External links

Tango.info profile of Alfredo Le Pera
Alfredo Le Pera biography at todotango.com 

Argentine journalists
Male journalists
Argentine dramatists and playwrights
Argentine lyricists
Argentine people of Italian descent
Brazilian emigrants to Argentina
Brazilian people of Italian descent
People of Calabrian descent
Tango poets
1900 births
1935 deaths
Writers from São Paulo
Burials at La Chacarita Cemetery
Victims of aviation accidents or incidents in Colombia
20th-century dramatists and playwrights
Tango lyricists
20th-century journalists